Cucurbitaria is a genus of corticioid fungi in the family Cucurbitariaceae. The genus was circumscribed by Samuel Frederick Gray in 1821.

Species

Cucurbitaria acervata
Cucurbitaria amorphae
Cucurbitaria aspegrenii
Cucurbitaria asteropycnidia
Cucurbitaria berberidis
Cucurbitaria bicolor
Cucurbitaria brevibarbata
Cucurbitaria broussonetiae
Cucurbitaria callista
Cucurbitaria caraganae
Cucurbitaria carnosa
Cucurbitaria castaneae
Cucurbitaria coluteae
Cucurbitaria conglobata
Cucurbitaria coryli
Cucurbitaria delitescens
Cucurbitaria destreae
Cucurbitaria dulcamarae
Cucurbitaria echinata
Cucurbitaria elongata
Cucurbitaria erratica
Cucurbitaria euonymi
Cucurbitaria friesii
Cucurbitaria hirtella
Cucurbitaria homalea
Cucurbitaria karstenii
Cucurbitaria laburni
Cucurbitaria laurocerasi
Cucurbitaria leptospora
Cucurbitaria lisae
Cucurbitaria naucosa
Cucurbitaria negundinis
Cucurbitaria obducens
Cucurbitaria occidentalis
Cucurbitaria pakistanica
Cucurbitaria piceae
Cucurbitaria plagia
Cucurbitaria pricesiana
Cucurbitaria pulveracea
Cucurbitaria rabenhorstii
Cucurbitaria rhamni
Cucurbitaria rhododendri
Cucurbitaria ribis
Cucurbitaria rubefaciens
Cucurbitaria salicina
Cucurbitaria seriata
Cucurbitaria setosa
Cucurbitaria solitaria
Cucurbitaria sorbi
Cucurbitaria spartii
Cucurbitaria spiraearum
Cucurbitaria staphula
Cucurbitaria subcaespitosa
Cucurbitaria vitis

References

Pleosporales
Taxa named by Samuel Frederick Gray
Taxa described in 1821
Dothideomycetes genera